= Robert L. Sani =

- Born: April 22, 1935; Antioch, California, U.S.
- Died: June 19, 2021 (aged 86); Bellingham, Washington, U.S.
- Known for: Computational fluid dynamics, finite element method
- Spouse: Martha Jo Sani (m. 1966)
- Awards: Guggenheim Fellowship (1970)

Academic background
- Education: University of California, Berkeley (BS, MS); University of Minnesota (PhD)

Academic work
- Discipline: Chemical Engineering
- Institutions: Rensselaer Polytechnic Institute; University of Illinois Urbana-Champaign; University of Colorado Boulder

Robert LeRoy Sani (April 22, 1935 – June 19, 2021) was an American chemical engineer and professor of chemical engineering at the University of Colorado Boulder, specializing in fluid dynamics, electrochemical engineering, and numerical methods in transport phenomena.

== Early life and education ==
Sani earned his Bachelor of Science (1958) and Master of Science (1960) in chemical engineering from the University of California, Berkeley. He completed his Ph.D. in chemical engineering at the University of Minnesota in 1963.

== Academic career ==
Sani taught at Rensselaer Polytechnic Institute from 1963 to 1964 and joined the faculty at the University of Illinois Urbana-Champaign in 1964 as an assistant professor, later becoming associate professor in 1970. In 1976, he joined the Department of Chemical Engineering at the University of Colorado Boulder as a full professor, serving on the faculty until his retirement in 2012 when he was named professor emeritus.

In 1970, Sani was awarded a Guggenheim Fellowship in Engineering by the John Simon Guggenheim Memorial Foundation. He served on the editorial board of the International Journal for Numerical Methods in Fluids.

== Research and published works ==
Sani's research centered on computational fluid dynamics, free and moving boundary problems, and transport phenomena. In 1981, he co-authored a foundational study on pressure approximation errors in finite element solutions of the incompressible Navier–Stokes equations.

With Philip M. Gresho, Sani co-authored the two-volume reference monograph Incompressible Flow and the Finite Element Method, published by John Wiley & Sons in 1998 and 2000. The work received independent scholarly reviews in peer-reviewed journals, including the Journal of Fluid Mechanics, Applied Mechanics Reviews, and Mathematical Reviews.

He also co-edited the volume Low-Gravity Fluid Dynamics and Transport Phenomena (1990) for the American Institute of Aeronautics and Astronautics (AIAA).

== Personal life ==
Sani married Martha Jo in 1966. He died in Bellingham, Washington, on June 19, 2021, at the age of 86.
